The Men's relay event of the Biathlon World Championships 2015 was held on 14 March 2015.

Results
The race was started at 17:30 EET.

References

Men's relay